Bay County is a county on the Emerald Coast in Northwest Florida. As of the 2020 census, the population was 175,216. Its county seat is Panama City.

Bay County is included in the Panama City, Florida Metropolitan Statistical Area.

History

On February 12, 1913, representatives from five towns on St. Andrews Bay met in Panama City to select a name for a proposed new county. The name Bay was selected because it was satisfactory to the majority of the citizens and descriptive of the territory that would be included. On July 1, 1913, the Legislature created Bay County from portions of Washington, Calhoun and Walton counties.

Panama City was where Gideon v. Wainwright, a 1963 US Supreme Court decision that gave all persons accused of a crime the right to an attorney paid for by the government, originated.

Geography

Adjacent counties
 Washington County - north
 Jackson County - northeast
 Calhoun County - east
 Gulf County - southeast
 Walton County - west

National protected area
 Apalachicola National Forest (part)

Demographics

As of the 2020 United States census, there were 175,216 people, 73,536 households, and 47,432 families residing in the county.

As of the census of 2000, there were 148,217 people, 59,597 households, and 40,466 families residing in the county. The population density was 194 people per square mile (75/km2). There were 78,435 housing units at an average density of 103 per square mile (40/km2). The racial makeup of the county was 84.17% White, 10.64% Black or African American, 0.78% Native American, 1.73% Asian, 0.08% Pacific Islander, 0.66% from other races, and 1.94% from two or more races. 2.42% of the population were Hispanic or Latino of any race.

There were 59,597 households, out of which 30.60% had children under the age of 18 living with them, 52.00% were married couples living together, 12.00% had a female householder with no husband present, and 32.10% were non-families. 26.00% of all households were made up of individuals, and 8.80% had someone living alone who was 65 years of age or older. The average household size was 2.43 and the average family size was 2.92.

In the county, the population was spread out, with 24.00% under the age of 18, 8.70% from 18 to 24, 30.20% from 25 to 44, 23.70% from 45 to 64, and 13.40% who were 65 years of age or older. The median age was 37 years. For every 100 females there were 98.10 males. For every 100 females age 18 and over, there were 95.80 males.

The median income for a household in the county was $36,092, and the median income for a family was $42,729. Males had a median income of $30,116 versus $21,676 for females. The per capita income for the county was $18,700. About 9.80% of families and 13.00% of the population were below the poverty line, including 18.30% of those under age 18 and 11.00% of those age 65 or over.

Government

Elected Officials

Board of Commissioners
5 members, elected from districts (zero Democrats, five Republicans)

Politics

Voter registration
According to the Secretary of State's office, Republicans are a majority of the registered voters in Bay County.

Statewide elections

Education
Bay District Schools operates public schools serving all portions of the county except Mexico Beach, which is served by Gulf County Schools.

Schools in Bay County

Pre-K – 12 schools

Deane Bozeman School

North Bay Haven Charter Academy

Palm Bay Preparatory Academy

PreK-8 Schools

Breakfast Point Academy

Bay Haven Charter Academy

University Academy

High schools

Zoned

J. R. Arnold High School (Panama City Beach)

Bay High School (Panama City)

A. Crawford Mosley High School (Lynn Haven)

Rutherford High School (Springfield)

Optional

A.D. Harris High School (Panama City)

Haney Technical High School (Panama City)

New Horizons Learning Center (Lynn Haven)

Rosenwald High School (Panama City)

Middle schools

Jinks Middle School

Merritt Brown Middle School

Mowat Middle School

Surfside Middle School (Panama City Beach)

Elementary schools

Callaway Elementary School

Cedar Grove Elementary School

Deer Point Elementary School
 
Hiland Park Elementary School

Hutchison Beach Elementary School (Panama City Beach)

Lucille Moore Elementary School

Lynn Haven Elementary School

M. Cherry Street Elementary School

Millville Elementary School

Northside Elementary School

Oakland Terrace Elementary School

Parker Elementary School

Patronis Elementary School (Panama City Beach)

Patterson Elementary School

Southport Elementary School

St. Andrew Elementary School

Tommy Smith Elementary School

Tyndall Elementary School

Waller Elementary School

West Bay Elementary School

Public transportation

Airports
The Northwest Florida Beaches International Airport opened for commercial flights in 2010. It connects the region to several major airports in the South and Midwest.

Public surface transportation
The county operates the Baytown Trolley, which runs several routes in and around Panama City. The county also have a greyhound in Panama City.

Library

Bay County is part of the Northwest Regional Library System (NWRLS), which also serves Gulf and Liberty Counties. The Bay County Public Library is the headquarters library for the system. The Bay County Board of Commissioners is the system's governing authority and single administrative unit.

Locations:
 Bay County Public Library
 Panama City Beach Public Library
 Parker Public Library
 Springfield Public Library
 Gulf County Public Library
 Charles Whitehead Public Library
 Harrell Memorial Library of Liberty County
 Jimmy Weaver Memorial Library
 Bay County Law Library (at the Bay County Public Library)

Communities

Cities

 Callaway
 Lynn Haven
 Mexico Beach
 Panama City
 Panama City Beach
 Parker
 Springfield

Census-designated places

 Cedar Grove
 Laguna Beach
 Lower Grand Lagoon
 Pretty Bayou
 Tyndall AFB
 Upper Grand Lagoon

Unincorporated communities

 Bayou George
 Cedar Grove
 Fountain
 Glenwood
 Millville
 Sand Hills
 Santa Monica
 Southport
 Sunnyside
 Vicksburg
 Youngstown

Former Census-designated places

 Hiland Park

See also

 National Register of Historic Places listings in Bay County, Florida

Notes

References

External links

Government links/Constitutional offices
 Bay County Board of County Commissioners
 Bay County Supervisor of Elections
 Bay County Property Appraiser
 Bay County Sheriff's Office
 Bay County Tax Collector

Special districts
 Bay District Schools
 Beach Mosquito Control District
 Northwest Florida Water Management District
 Panama City-Bay County Airport and Industrial District

Judicial branch
 Bay County Clerk of Courts
  Circuit and County Court for the 14th Judicial Circuit of Florida serving Bay, Calhoun, Gulf, Holmes, Jackson and Washington counties

Tourism links
 Panama City Beach Convention and Visitors Bureau

News media
 Panama City News Herald
 94.5 WFLA - FOX NEWS RADIO
 WYOO Talk Radio 101
 WMBB TV 13
 WJHG TV 7

 
Florida counties
1913 establishments in Florida
Populated places established in 1913
North Florida